Didymoteicho railway station is a railway station that serves the town of Didymoteicho, Evros in Eastern Macedonia and Thrace, Greece. Today TrainOSE operates just 4 daily Regional trains to Alexandroupoli and Ormenio.

History
The station lies on the line built by the Chemins de fer Orientaux (CO), from Istanbul to Vienna. The railway reached Didymoteicho, known as Demotika during Ottoman rule. In 1873, when the line from Istanbul to Edirne and Bulgaria was opened.  A  branch from Pythio to Alexandroupoli (then known as Dedeağaç) was opened in 1874. When the railway was built, it was all within the Ottoman Empire. After World War I and the subsequent Greek-Turkish War from 1919 to 1922, and finally peace in the form of the Lausanne treaty, the Chemins de fer Orientaux (CO) ended up having a network straddling Turkey and Greece, Didymoteicho became part of Greece and the line administrated by Greece.

In 1920s, the station became part Franco-Hellenic railway. On 31 December 1970 Hellenic State Railways ceased to exist, the next day all railways in Greece (with the exception of private industrial lines and E.I.S.) were transferred to Hellenic Railways Organisation S.A., a state-owned corporation. In 1986 was created the new railway station of Didymoteicho, was nearby the old station. In 2009, with the Greek debt crisis unfolding OSE's Management was forced to reduce services across the network. Timetables were cut back, and routes closed as the government-run entity attempted to reduce overheads. Services from Orestiada to Alexandroupoli were cut back to three trains a day, reducing the reliability of services and passenger numbers.

On 13 February 2011, all international services were suspended due to the Greek financial crisis and subsequent budget cuts by the Greek government. As a result, all cross border routes were closed and international services (to Istanbul, Sofia, etc.) ended. Thus, only two routes now connect Didymoteicho with Thessaloniki and Athens (and those with a connection to Alex / Polis), while route time increased as the network was "upgraded".

The Greek writer and economist Konstantinos Triantaphyllakis visited the station in his youth to watch the train and the musical antics of the station master.

The old train station building feature as a Print Designed by Hercules Milas

Facilities
The original station buildings are a beautiful example of late 19th-century railway architecture, but rundown and almost abandoned. A new station complex was built in 1970s adjacent to the original structure, with a ticket office and waiting rooms. As of (2020) the station is unstaffed.

Services
, Didymoteicho is only serviced by four daily pairs of Regional trains Alexandroupoli–Ormenio, two of which are express services.

Between July 2005 and February 2011 the Friendship Express (an international InterCity train jointly operated by the Turkish State Railways (TCDD) and TrainOSE linking Istanbul's Sirkeci Terminal, Turkey and Thessaloniki, Greece) passed through Didymoteicho, but did not call at the station.

Station layout

Gallery

References

Railway stations in Eastern Macedonia and Thrace
Railway stations opened in the 1870s
Buildings and structures in Evros (regional unit)